Gregory Nelson is a footballer.

Gregory Nelson may also refer to:

Gregory R Nelson Sr., businessman

See also
Greg Nelson (disambiguation)
Nelson Gregory, Home and Away character